Rosena is an unincorporated community in Albemarle County, Virginia. It lies at the intersection of Rt. 20 and Rt. 640, within the Stony Point community. The sole service is a single general store, "Grand Junction," which long did business under the name of "Bobbi's." As of 1904, the United States Geological Survey designated it as a "post village," indicating that at that time there was a post office. And as of 1910, the population was great enough to warrant a stop by the "traveling library stations" of the Virginia State Library.

References

Unincorporated communities in Virginia
Unincorporated communities in Albemarle County, Virginia